The 2022 North American and Caribbean Senior Club Championship was the third edition of the North American and Caribbean Senior Club Championship which is a qualifying tournament for the 2022 IHF Men's Super Globe. It was held in Monterrey, Mexico from 25 to 30 July 2022.

Venue
The championship was played in Monterrey.

Teams

Following teams were already qualified for the tournament.

Results
All times are local (UTC–5).

Group A

Group B

Knockout stage

Bracket

Fifth place game

Semifinals

Third place game

Final

Final standing

References

Weblinks

2022
North American and Caribbean Senior Club Championship
North American and Caribbean Senior Club Championship
International handball competitions hosted by Mexico
North American and Caribbean Senior Club Championship